Bay of Refugo, literally the bay of scrap, is a natural bay within the coastal extent of the civil parish of Porto Judeu, in the municipality of Angra do Heroísmo, on the Portuguese island of Terceira (in the archipelago of the Azores). It also refers to the small swimming area that faces into the bay.

History
The beach was formed through the erosion of volcanically-produced lava that originated during a series of eruptions that formed the Guilherme Moniz volcano in 1761. Lavas flowed to the sea by way of the hamlet of Serretinha in the civil parish of Feteira in the direction of Porto Judeu. The lava's path is still traceable: an area of scorched land characterized by black blocks of basalt mixed with large amounts of slag. When the lava flow neared the sea, it spread out and entered the salt water at several points, among them the Bay of Refugo. 
    
On 28 August 1893, a hurricane, at the time the largest storm in human memory, caused tremendous tidal surges together with punishing winds that ruined homes, churches, and barns that surrounded the bay. Ports were battered and a large number of vessels were lost. The damage caused by this hurricane is still visible near some sections of the southern coast, particularly in the former and now abandoned Church of São Mateus da Calehta (Igreja Velha de São Mateus da Calheta) and the homes of the Bay of Refugo.

Prior to these lava flows, the area was a small semi-sheltered cove used by fishermen to tie-up their boats. Today, the area is classified by the Government of the Azores as a Class 1 bathing beach (according to the definition spelled out in Regional Decree 1/2005/A, 15 February 2005); it has a fresh-water swimming pool and a well-equipped children's playground.

See also
 List of bays in the Azores

Angra do Heroísmo
Bay Refugo
Refugo